Mitchell Epstein (born 1952) is an American fine-art photographer. His books include Property Rights (2021), In India (2021), Sunshine Hotel (2019), Rocks and Clouds (2018), New York Arbor, (2013) Berlin (2011); American Power (2009); Mitch Epstein: Work ( 2006); Recreation: American Photographs 1973-1988 (2005); Family Business (2003), which won the 2004 Kraszna-Krausz Photography Book Award, and Vietnam:  A Book of Changes (1997).

Epstein's work has been exhibited and published extensively in the United States and Europe, and collected by numerous major museums, including New York's Museum of Modern Art and Whitney Museum of American Art, The J. Paul Getty Museum in Los Angeles, the San Francisco Museum of Modern Art, and the Tate Modern in London.

He has also worked as a director, cinematographer, and production designer on several films, including Dad, Salaam Bombay!, and Mississippi Masala.

Early life and education
Epstein was born and raised in a Jewish family in Holyoke, Massachusetts. He graduated from Williston Academy, where he studied with artist and bookmaker Barry Moser. In the early 1970s he studied at Union College, New York; Rhode Island School of Design, Rhode Island, and the Cooper Union, New York, where he was a student of photographer Garry Winogrand.

Career

By the mid-1970s, Epstein had abandoned his academic studies and begun to travel, embarking on a photographic exploration of the United States. Ten of the photographs he made during this period were in a 1977 group exhibition at Light Gallery in New York. Ben Lifson wrote in his Village Voice review: "Mitch Epstein's ten color photographs are the best things at Summer Light…. At 25, Epstein's apprenticeship is over, as his work shows. He stands between artistic tradition and originality and makes pictures about abandoned rocking-horses and danger, about middle-age dazzled by spring blossoms, about children confused by sex and beasts. He has learned the terms of black-and-white photography, and although he adds color, he hasn't abandoned them, loving photography's past while trying to step into its future."

In 1978, he journeyed to India with his future wife, director Mira Nair, where he was a producer, set designer, and cinematographer on several films, including Salaam Bombay! and India Cabaret.  His book In Pursuit of India is a compilation of his Indian photographs from this period.

From 1992 to 1995, Epstein photographed in Vietnam, which resulted in an exhibition of this work at Wooster Gardens in New York, along with a book titled Vietnam: A Book of Changes. "I don't know that Mitch Epstein's glorious photographs record all of what is salient in end-of-the-twentieth century Vietnam," wrote Susan Sontag for his book jacket, "for it's been more than two decades since my two stays there.  I can testify that his images confirm what moved and troubled me then…and offer shrewd and poignant glimpses into the costs of imposing a certain modernity.  This is beautiful, authoritative work by an extremely intelligent and gifted photographer."  Reviewing an exhibition of the Vietnam pictures for Art in America, Peter Von Ziegesar writes, "In a show full of small pleasures, little prepares one for the stunning epiphany contained in Perfume Pagoda…Few photographers have managed to make an image so loaded and so beautiful at once."

Having lived and traveled beyond the United States for over a decade, Epstein began to spend more time in his adopted home of New York City. His 1999 series The City investigated the relationship between public and private life in New York.  Reviewing The City exhibition at Sikkema Jenkins in New York, Vince Aletti wrote that the pictures "[are] as assured as they are ambitious."

In 1999,  Epstein returned to his hometown of Holyoke, Massachusetts, to record the demise of his father's two businesses—a retail furniture store and a low-rent real estate empire. The resulting project assembled large-format photographs, video, archival materials, interviews and writing by the artist. The book, Family Business, which combined all of these elements, won the 2004 Kraszna-Kraus Best Photography Book of the Year award. In reviewing the book, Nancy Princenthal wrote in Art in America, "The family business chronicled by Mitch Epstein was a small-town retail furniture with a sideline in real estate, and his patiently plotted bell curve of its history is worthy of Dreiser…." In 2004, his work was exhibited during evening screenings at Rencontres d'Arles festival (at the Théatre Antique), France.

From 2004 to 2009, Epstein investigated energy production and consumption in the United States, photographing in and around various energy production sites. This series, titled American Power, questions the meaning and make-up of power—electrical and political.  Epstein made a monograph of the American Power pictures (2009), in which he wrote that he was often stopped by corporate security guards and once interrogated by the FBI for standing on public streets and pointing his camera at energy infrastructure. The large-scale prints from this series have been exhibited worldwide.

In his Art in America review, Dave Coggins wrote that Epstein "grounds his images…in the human condition, combining empathy with sharp social observation, politics with sheer beauty." In an essay for the catalogue Contemporary African Photography from The Walther Collection: Appropriated Landscapes (Steidl, 2011), Brian Wallis wrote, "Epstein has made clear that his intention is neither to illustrate political events nor to create persuasive propaganda. Rather, he raises the more challenging question of how inherently abstract political concepts about the nation and the culture as a whole can be represented photographically…But equally significant is the unique form of documentary storytelling that he has invented in American Power—colorful, sweeping, concerned, intimate, honest." In the New York Times, Martha Schwendener wrote: "What is interesting, beyond the haunting, complicated beauty and precision of these images, is Mr. Epstein's ability to merge what have long been considered opposing terms: photo-conceptualism and so-called documentary photography. He utilizes the supersize scale and saturated color of conceptualism, and his odd, implied narratives strongly recall the work of artists like Jeff Wall."

In 2008, Epstein won the Berlin Prize in Arts and Letters from the American Academy in Berlin. Awarded a 6-month residency, he moved to Berlin with his wife and daughter from January–June 2008. The photographs he made there of significant historical sites were published in the monograph Berlin (Steidl and The American Academy in Berlin, 2011).

In 2009, Epstein collaborated with his second wife, author Susan Bell, on a public art project and website based on American Power. The What Is American Power? project used billboards, transportation posters, and a website to "inspire and educate people about environmental issues."

In 2013, The Walker Art Center in Minneapolis commissioned Epstein and cellist Erik Friedlander to create a theatrical performance of American Power, which premiered at the Walker and, in 2015, traveled to the Wexner Center for the Arts in Ohio and The Victoria and Albert Museum in London. Created in collaboration with directors Annie-B Parson and Paul Lazar, this theatrical rendition of Epstein's photographic series combines projected photographs, archival material, video, music, and storytelling.

For his recent New York trilogy, New York Arbor and Rocks and Clouds, Epstein photographed the city's trees, rocks, and clouds with an 8x10 view camera and black and white film to depict the interplay between society and nature: "Epstein's trees extend the photographer's longstanding interest in mankind's disruption of our environment," writes Rob Slifkin, "...his new work typically addresses this theme of human engagement with nature without recourse to the inclusion of actual people. Instead it is the way the human environment clumsily perches itself upon and amidst the natural world that defines Epstein's approach to landscape."

Recent solo exhibitions of Epstein's work were held at Sikkema Jenkins & Co. (2019), Yancey Richardson Gallery (2016), Galerie Thomas Zander (2016 & 2019), The A Foundation, Brussels (2013), Henri Cartier-Bresson Foundation in Paris (2011), Kunstmuseum Bonn (2011), the Musée de l'Élysée in Lausanne (2011), and Open Eye Gallery in Liverpool (2011).

Personal life
His first marriage to director Mira Nair ended in divorce. Epstein experienced "uncomfortable" racial discrimination due to his interracial relationship with Nair. 

Epstein identified his travels in India for his photography work and as part of Nair's various film productions as perspective-shifting. He describes the trips to India as the among the most important experiences in his life.

He currently lives in New York with his wife and frequent collaborator Susan Bell, and his daughter.

Awards 
 Guggenheim Fellowship from the John Simon Guggenheim Memorial Foundation (2002–2003)
 Kraszna-Krausz Photography Book Award (2004)
 American Academy in Berlin: Berlin Prize in Arts and Letters, Guna S. Mundheim Fellow in the Visual Arts (2008)
 Prix Pictet (2011)

Films 
India Cabaret (1985) – Director of photography
Salaam Bombay! (1988) – Cinematographer and production designer
Mississippi Masala (1992) – Cinematographer and production designer
Dad (2003) – Producer and director

Publications
In Pursuit of India. New York: Aperture, 1987. .
Fire, Water, Wind: Photographs from Tenri. Tenri-shi, Japan: Tenrikyō Dōyūsha, 1996. .
Vietnam: A Book of Changes. New York: Center for Documentary Studies in association with W.W. Norton & Co., 1997. .
The City. New York: powerHouse, 2002. .
Family Business. Göttingen, Germany: Steidl, 2003. .
Recreation: American photographs 1973-1988. Göttingen, Germany: Steidl, 2005. .
Work. Göttingen, Germany: Steidl, 2006. .
American Power. Göttingen, Germany: Steidl, 2009. .
Berlin. Göttingen, Germany: Steidl & The American Academy in Berlin, 2011. .
New York Arbor. Göttingen, Germany: Steidl, 2013. 
Rocks and Clouds. Göttingen, Germany: Steidl, 2018. 
Sunshine Hotel. Göttingen, Germany: Steidl/PPP 2019. 
Property Rights. Göttingen, Germany: Steidl 2021. 
In India. Göttingen, Germany: Steidl 2021.

References

External links

Mitch Epstein on Artnet.com

1952 births
Living people
20th-century American Jews
American portrait photographers
American photojournalists
American cinematographers
American production designers
People from Holyoke, Massachusetts
Cooper Union alumni
Rhode Island School of Design alumni
Union College (New York) alumni
21st-century American Jews